Cristian Ramón Jiménez Ducloux (born 18 July 2002) is a Mexican professional footballer who plays as an attacking midfielder for Liga MX club Cruz Azul.

Career statistics

Club

Honours
Cruz Azul
Campeón de Campeones: 2021

References

External links
 
 
 

Living people
2002 births
Mexican footballers
Association football midfielders
Cruz Azul footballers
Liga MX players
Footballers from Mexico City